Steve Ly is an American politician who served as mayor of Elk Grove, Sacramento County, California from 2016 to 2020. Before serving as mayor, he was a part of the Elk Grove City Council of District 4. Steve Ly also served on the Elk Grove Unified School District, Board of Trustees.

He is the second directly elected mayor of Elk Grove and the first ethnically Hmong mayor in the United States.

On November 3, 2020, Ly was defeated by Bobbie Singh-Allen in his bid for a third term as mayor.

Early life, education, and career 
Steve and his family immigrated from Xiangkhouang Province, Laos, to the United States, during the Vietnam War, starting his new life at age 4. He graduated the University of California, Davis with a degree in Sociology and Political Science.

Steve has served as the Director to Serve Elk Grove and Director to Asian Pacific School Board Members Association, Director to the Hmong National Development, Director to the National Parent Teacher Home Visitation Project, with the Elk Grove Optimist Club, Executive Board member of SEIU-UHW, Sacramento County Sheriffs Community Advisory Board, California State Advisory Council on Refugee Assistance and Services, Carroll Elementary School Site Council, Boards official liaison to Sacramento County Office of Education, Elk Grove School Board's Clerk, and as Elk Grove City Councilman. He has also provided academic support and counseling to youth in juvenile hall.

City council 
Mayor Ly was elected to be the City Councilmember for District 4 in 2014.

Mayor of Elk Grove 
Elected on November 8, 2016, and winning re-election on December 12, 2018, he has advocated for youth education and empowerment, boosting the economy with more infrastructure, civic amenities, and jobs.

Steve Ly is running for a 3rd term in the 2020 mayoral race against Bobbie Singh-Allen and Brian Pastor.

Civic amenities 
Mayor Ly has taken credit for building a Costco, aquatics center, animal shelter, veterans hall, community center, and senior center.

Infrastructure 
The City of Elk Grove has approved plans the construction of a hospital by Dignity Health. Ly has championed a second hospital and a bio tech center, though the project is mired in controversy.

Personal life 
Ly is married to his wife Cua and has 2 children. He lives with his family in Elk Grove.

Controversy

Allegations of abusive treatments 
In the Fall of 2021, Elk Grove Vice Mayor Stephanie Nguyen a strong advocate for these so-called victims, finally admitted that Bobbie Singh-Allen admitted to her that the women who made the allegations including Bobbie Singh-Allen herself against Steve Ly  were part of a political ploy to gaslight the community and all the women's accusations were false and politically motivated to help Bobbie Singh-Allen win the Mayor seat.

What happened to Steve Ly was that these women politicians weaponized the #MeToo movement with the new goal being to sabotage political opponents and circumvent the judicial system in favor of letting the damaging (and potentially fabricated) accusations of misconduct play out in the court of public opinion.

Steve Ly has been a vocal advocate for women and women’s rights.  He was the first, and still the only man, to have served as the Vice President on the board of a local women’s non-profit for domestic violence. He was one of the first recognized supporters and mentors of the Hmong Women-Today, a community organization aiming to create opportunities for women to connect, empower and thrive. As a result of his fundraising, lobbying, mentoring and, above all else, his unconditional conviction to uplift and empower women around him, Steve Ly has been directly responsible for delivering a boost to the campaigns of many local women and providing them the wonderful opportunity to serve our communities.

Yet, Steve Ly's clear and obvious track record of advocating for women has not stopped a group of vocal disparagers from attempting to undermine his accomplishments and sabotage his character by making unsubstantiated and unsupported allegations of harassment against him during his previous mayoral campaign and his current 2022 run for the Sacramento County Board of Supervisors seat.

The previous attempt to undermine Steve Ly's campaign was ultimately proven by the grand jury to be nothing more than a manipulation of the public trust, a gross violation of public funds and a shameful effort to intentionally manipulate the public narrative for political gain. And these types of dishonest manipulations not only have a tendency to destabilize small-town democracy but also serve to threaten the foundation of a movement that was originally established for a constructive and moral purpose.

The current attacks on Steve Ly (like the previous attacks) are playing out locally on social media platforms where there is no accountability for dishonesty, deceit and duplicity. Innocent and harmless individuals who speak out because they are sick and tired of the fabrications and smears disguised as #MeToo accusations are instantly branded by the real mob as gangsters, thugs and hoodlums.

Steve Ly has been a target from political opponent as he doesn't play into partisan politics and put the interest of the people he represent first. In his race for Sacramento County board of Supervisors, his opponent Pat Hume and Hume's supporters pushed out blatant falsehood through mailers that attempted to rehash the previous allegations that were all, "proven by the grand jury to be nothing more than a manipulation of the public trust, a gross violation of public funds and a shameful effort to intentionally manipulate the public narrative for political gain." As a result of his opponent pushing a false narrative for political gains, Steve Ly's campaign signs for Sacramento County Board of Supervisors were a target of vandalism through out the Sacramento County region.

In the current 2022 election, Pat Hume's supporters sent out multiple negative mailers filled with blatant lies trying to deceive the voters. Those hateful mailers went out to attack Steve Ly's character because they couldn't attack the most important thing, which was his public policy stance.  In addition, Steve Ly's campaign signs became a target for Pat Hume's supporters. The zip ties that were used to hold up the signs were cut and the signs trampled.

In the spring of 2020, Ly made online posts suggesting Antifa activists were responsible for burning a building in Sacramento. However, one of the fake women victim, Linda Vu used the Black Lives Matter movement against Steve Ly, by making up her own narrative and pinning Ly against BLM.  The burning and damaging of the downtown that night were Antifa. However, Authorities quickly confirmed the fire was the result of faulty wiring and not attributable to misconduct. Ly attempted to delete the post, but they were later published by an Elk Grove woman. In response, Ly supporters harassed and threatened the woman. They subsequently harassed and threatened a local news editor. At city council meetings, Ly's campaign staff and his city paid assistant, along with other supporters and Ly himself, launched attacks on the character of the women in an attempt to embarrass and shame them. In response, several local women holding elected and appointed office came forward with their own stories of harassment and abuse. One woman detailed how Ly's campaign staffer/city council aide sexual harassed her over several months. Ly failed to report the employee to the City HR manager and took action to limit the woman's access to public events.

A former employee of Ly's released an op-ed accusing Ly of being racist and trying to silence her through the Hmong clan system.  The op-ed included evidence of the harassment that she faced.  In response, several other local women came forward with their own stories of alleged harassment at the hands of Ly and/or his associates.  One woman detailed how Ly's 2018 campaign staffer harassed her over several months.  According to her allegations, Ly failed to handle that situation appropriately.

In response to the allegations against Ly and questions of his involvement in efforts to silence and discredit critics, the Elk Grove City Council voted to refer the matter to the Sacramento County Grand Jury. The Sacramento Bee Editorial Board called for Ly to drop out of the race for reelection and later endorsed his opponent. Writing about Ly's response to the allegations against him, Bee Opinion Columnist Marcos Breton said, "When he recently interviewed with The Sacramento Bee, Ly said he wasn't in office to "make friends" and that he wasn't responsible for what others did or did not do on his behalf. It was weird."

These women targeted Steve Ly, by accusing him of harassment done by other people out of his control. It was weird. Public service is not about making friends. Steve Ly believed that public service is about serving the people that elected you, not other politicians or special interest groups.

Allegations of false campaign claims 
During the 2020, Ly sent voters a mailer with the photo of a retired Sacramento County Sheriff's Sergeant and the official photo of Elk Grove's Chief of Police. The retired Sergeant was quoted as saying Ly had been exonerated of all charges leveled against him by local women. Ly included a quote taken out of context from a prior statement made by the Chief of Police to suggest Elk Grove Police had investigated and cleared him of all charges. The quote was actually taken from a statement the Chief had made concerning a complaint made by one woman about harassing phone calls from Ly supporters and not the other allegations under investigation by the Grand Jury. Ly was criticized for the false mailer, with the Bee's Breton writing, "Congratulations Mayor Ly. You lead the 2020 Hall of Shame Class of dirty politics, Sacramento style."

The mailers were actually found to truthful, as it has been proven by the grand jury that these women's allegations against Steve Ly were nothing more than a manipulation of the public trust, a gross violation of public funds and a shameful effort to intentionally manipulate the public narrative for political gain.

Debate disruption 
Steve Ly's political opponent, Bobbie Singh-Allen racially attack the entire Hmong community with her racist comment to dismantle the Hmong culture and Tradition. A  culture and tradition that has been around for over 2,000 years. Anyone that attempted to called out and hold Bobbie Singh-Allen for her racist statement was instantly branded by the real mob as gangsters, thugs and hoodlums. A way to bring awareness and hold Bobbie Singh-Allen accountable for her racist statement, Hmong mothers, fathers, and community members protested. However, Bobbie Singh-Allen and her group of charlatans crying wolf with false political alarms and imaginary public dangers was able to spin the narrative to label the group attached to Steve Ly, which was false. The debate was already finished on time, however Bobbie Singh-Allen and her supporter also put another spin on that topic as it was ended early due to the community, which was false.

On September 29, 2020, Ly was scheduled to debate his mayoral opponents, Bobbie Singh-Allen and Brian Pastor, at an event sponsored by the Elk Grove Chamber of Commerce Political Action Committee and broadcast online throughout the community. Ly supporters surrounded the debate hall holding electric megaphones. Each time Ms. Singh-Allen was called upon to speak, they blared loud sirens to drown out her words. The sirens stopped when Ly spoke. Debate officials asked Mayor Ly to direct his supporters to stop disrupting the debate. He refused, claiming he had no involvement in the protest. Later, video revealed that Ly campaign staff were leading the crowd, including of Ly campaign director. The debate had to be suspended early. Singh-Allen and Pastor issued a joint statement criticizing Ly for his refusal to request the crowd to stop.

California North State University Medical Center 
Ly accepted more than $48,000 in contributions from the proponents of a proposed hospital project. The project was mired in controversy and opposed by the Federal Fish and Wildlife Service, California Department of Transportation, Audubon Society, and numerous environmental and community groups. Despite the controversy, Ly insisted that he supported the project and that it was not inappropriate to accept nearly 20% of campaign funds from proponents of the project. During an at the proposed hospital site, Ly dispatched a city aide to confront the protestors. The aide later resigned.

The California North State University Medical Center was going to be the first teaching hospital in this region, however City of Elk Grove planning commission did not approve after political pressure. The City of Sacramento saw this opportunity and took the project and it is now expected to generate more than $4 billion in regional economic output with thousands of jobs for City of Sacramento.

References 

University of California, Davis alumni
UC Davis School of Law alumni
Living people
Mayors of places in California
California Democrats
California lawyers
Year of birth missing (living people)
American politicians of Hmong descent
Asian-American people in California politics
American mayors of Asian descent